The Women's time trial of the 2016 UCI Road World Championships took place in and around in Doha, Qatar on 11 October 2016. Linda Villumsen won her first world time trial title in 2015 but did not take part in the 2016 race.

2008 world champion Amber Neben, from the United States, claimed her second rainbow jersey, completing the course 5.99 seconds quicker than the European champion Ellen van Dijk, from the Netherlands. Australia's Katrin Garfoot, the Oceanian champion, won the bronze medal, 2.33 seconds behind van Dijk and 8.32 seconds in arrears of Neben's winning time.

Qualification

Qualification for the event

All National Federations were allowed to enter four riders for the race, with a maximum of two riders to start. In addition to this number, the outgoing World Champion, the Olympic champion and the current continental champions were also able to take part.

Schedule
All times are in Arabia Standard Time (UTC+3).

Final classification

* Aljersiwi fell during her race by riding into a fence.

References

Women's time trial
UCI Road World Championships – Women's time trial
2016 in women's road cycling